Woot is an e-commerce retailer.

Woot may also refer to:

People
 Woot., abbreviation for Elmer Otis Wooton used with botanical nomenclature

Art, entertainment, and media
 w00t, an album by the band Garaj Mahal
 Woot the Wanderer, a character who appears in L. Frank Baum's novel The Tin Woodman of Oz (1918)
 WOOT-LD, a television station licensed to serve Chattanooga, Tennessee

Other uses
 Woot, a deity of the people of the Kuba Kingdom (in the modern-day Democratic Republic of the Congo)
 WOOT or Worldwide Online Olympiad Training, a program for gifted high school mathematics students

See also
 w00t (W-zero-zero-t), a slang term used to express excitement or happiness